Sacisaurus ("Saci lizard") is a silesaurid dinosauriform from the Late Triassic (Norian) Caturrita Formation of southern Brazil. The scientific name, Sacisaurus agudoensis, refers to the city where the species was found, Agudo in the Rio Grande do Sul state, whereas Sacisaurus refers to Saci, a famous one-legged creature from Brazilian mythology, because among the dozens of fossil material unearthed, 35 right femora were collected whereas only 1 left femur was found.

Characteristics 

Some elements that were originally mentioned in the description study were reassigned to other taxa afterwards. Its long and strong legs indicate that it was a fast animal.

The well-preserved jaw indicates that Sacisaurus was an herbivore, and there is a process at the tip that resembles the ornithischian predentary bone. Further research attempted to define if Sacisaurus was the oldest ornithischian dinosaur. In 2011, a cladistic analysis of some of its morphological particularities found that its closest relative was the silesaurid Diodorus.

History 
Sacisaurus was discovered in 2001 in the small municipality of Agudo, in the countryside of Rio Grande do Sul state. With 50 bones, scientists assembled the skeleton and speculated on how the animal might have lived. The fossil was presented for the first time in the 2nd Latin American Congress of Vertebrate Paleontology in 2005. .

After the work of Brazilian scientists, the announcement of the discovery of the new species was made on November 1, 2006 at the University of São Paulo, Ribeirão Preto, where the bones were identified and the paper was published in the British scientific journal Historical Biology: A Journal of Paleobiology on October 30, 2006.

The discovery helped scientists to study the feeding habits of dinosaurs and their close relatives, since it is one of the oldest ever found.

References

External links 
  Folha online - Brasil "ganha" dinossauro de 220 milhões de anos

Silesaurids
Norian genera
Late Triassic reptiles of South America
Triassic Brazil
Fossils of Brazil
Paraná Basin
Fossil taxa described in 2006